Karl Joseph Bobek (1855–1899) was a German mathematician working on elliptic functions and geometry.

References

External links
 
 

19th-century German mathematicians
1899 deaths
1855 births